Ali Cansun Begeçarslan (born 18 September 1982) is a Turkish former professional football player.

Career
Successfully promoted from Beşiktaş PAF, youth section of Beşiktaş J.K. in 2001, Cansun was a part of title-winning squad of Beşiktaş at its centenary year in 2003.

Personal life
Begeçarslan is an Beşiktaş avid fan. His father is emigrated Turkey from Albania. He is married and have one son, named Berk Ali.

Honours
Beşiktaş
Süper Lig (1): 2002–03

References

External links
 

1982 births
Living people
Footballers from Istanbul
Association football forwards
Turkey youth international footballers
Turkish footballers
Eyüpspor footballers
Adana Demirspor footballers
Diyarbakırspor footballers
Kocaelispor footballers
Hacettepe S.K. footballers
Neftçi PFK players
Gaziantepspor footballers
Antalyaspor footballers
Gençlerbirliği S.K. footballers
Sakaryaspor footballers
Beşiktaş J.K. footballers
Turkish expatriate footballers
Expatriate footballers in Azerbaijan
Süper Lig players
TFF First League players
TFF Second League players